Chelonomorpha is a genus of moths of the family Noctuidae.

Species
 Chelonomorpha austeni Moore, 1879
 Chelonomorpha burmana Strand, 1912
 Chelonomorpha formosana Miyake, 1907
 Chelonomorpha japana Motschulsky, 1860

References
 Chelonomorpha at Markku Savela's Lepidoptera and Some Other Life Forms
 Natural History Museum Lepidoptera genus database

Agaristinae